Maengsan County is a kun (county) in South P'yŏngan, North Korea.

Administrative districts

The district is split into one ŭp (town) and 24 ri (villages):

References

External links
  Map of Pyongan provinces
  Detailed map

Counties of South Pyongan